Mascolo is a surname. Notable people with the surname include:
 Anthony Mascolo (born 1957), British hairdresser and creative director of TIGI
 Gianni Mascolo (born 1940), Italian singer
 Joseph Mascolo (1929−2016), American musician and dramatic actor
 Luigi Mascolo, Italian priest
 Toni Mascolo (1942–2017), British hairdresser and businessman, co-founder of Toni & Guy